The Kingdom of Ndongo (Kimbundu: Utuminu ua Ndongo, Utuminu ua Ngola), formerly known as Angola or Dongo, was an early-modern African state located in what is now Angola.

The Kingdom of Ndongo is first recorded in the sixteenth century.  It was one of multiple vassal states to Kongo, though Ndongo was the most powerful of these with a king called the Ngola.

Little is known of the kingdom in the early sixteenth century. "Angola" was listed among the titles of the King of Kongo in 1535, so it is likely that it was in somewhat subordinate to Kongo.  Its own oral traditions, collected in the late sixteenth century, particularly by the Jesuit Baltasar Barreira, described the founder of the kingdom, Ngola Kiluanje, also known as Ngola Inene, as a migrant from Kongo, chief of a Kimbundu-speaking ethnic group.

Social and political structure
The Kimbundu-speaking region was known as the land of Mbundu, and according to late sixteenth-century accounts, it was divided into 736 small political units ruled by sobas.  These sobas and their territories (called murinda) were compact groupings of villages (senzala or libatas, probably following the Kikongo term divata) surrounding a small central town (mbanza).

These political units were often grouped into larger units called kanda and sometimes provinces.  Larger kingdoms may have emerged in earlier times, but in the sixteenth century, most of these regions had been united by the rulers of Ndongo.  Ndongo's capital city was called Kabasa (Caculo Cabaça), located on the highlands near modern-day N'dalatando.  This was a large town, holding as many as 50,000 people in its densely populated district.

The king of Ndongo and the leaders of the various provinces ruled with a council of powerful nobles, the macota,  and had an administration headed by the tendala, a judicial figure, and the ngolambole, a military leader.  In Ndongo itself, the ruler had an even larger group of bureaucrats, including a quartermaster called kilunda and another similar official called the mwene kudya.

Social structure was anchored on the ana murinda ("children of the murinda") or free commoners.  In addition to the commoners, there were two servile groups  the ijiko (sing., kijiko), unfree commoners who were permanently attached to the land as serfs, and the abika (sing., mubika) or salable slaves.

History

Rise of Ndongo
The Kingdom of Ndongo was a tributary to the Kingdom of Kongo along with various other polities outside of Kongo proper. The Kingdom of Mbundu in the south and the BaKongo in the north were always at odds, but Kongo managed to exact tribute from these states since before the colonization by the Portuguese.

Seeds of independence
In 1518 the Kingdom of Ndongo sent an embassy to Portugal asking for missionaries and (indirectly) for recognition as independent of Kongo.  A Portuguese mission arrived in Ndongo in 1520 but local disputes and perhaps Kongo pressure forced the missionaries to withdraw. Afonso I of Kongo took the missionaries to Kongo and left his own priest in Ndongo.

War of 1556
Around 1556 Ndongo sent another mission to Portugal seeking military assistance and offering to be baptized, even though Portuguese officials at the time were unsure of the religious sincerity.  In 1901, historian E.G. Ravenstein claimed that this mission was the result of a war between Kongo and Ndongo, in which Ndongo won and claimed its independence, which was also claimed by historian Jan Vansina in 1966 and then others, but this appears to have been a misreading of the original sources. Ndongo may well have seen the mission as a sort of declaration of independence since Kongo's response to the 1518 mission suggests that it still maintained sufficient control to prevent it being an independent move.

The second Portuguese mission arrived at the mouth of the Cuanza River in 1560, headed by Paulo Dias de Novais, grandson of the famous explorer Bartolomeu Dias, and including several Jesuit priests including Francisco de Gouveia.  This mission also failed and Dias de Novais returned to Portugal in 1564, leaving Gouveia behind.

The Portuguese colony of Angola
By the time of the third mission in 1571, the King of Portugal Sebastian I had decided to charge Dias de Novais with the conquest and subjugation of the "Kingdom of Angola", authorizing him to govern the region, bring in settlers, and build forts. Dias de Novais arrived in Luanda by arrangement with Kongo's king Álvaro I in recompense for Portugal's assistance against the Jaga. Quilongo, the king of Angola, renewed the connection with Portugal in 1578. Unable to conquer any territory on his own, Dias de Novais made alliances with both Kongo and Ndongo, serving as a mercenary army.

The First Portuguese-Ndongo War
In 1579, Portuguese merchants who had settled in Kongo, led by Francisco Barbuda, advised Njinga Ndambi Kilombo kia Kasenda that Portugal intended to take over his country.  Acting on this intelligence and advice, Njinga Ndambi tricked the Portuguese forces into an ambush and massacred them at his capital.

The war that followed witnessed a Kongo invasion which was narrowly defeated in 1580, and a Portuguese offensive up the Kwanza river, resulting in the founding of their fort at Massangano in 1582. A number of sobas switched their allegiance to Portugal and soon many of the coastal provinces were joined to the colony. By 1590, the Portuguese decided to attack the core of Ndongo and sent an army against Kabasa itself.  Ndongo, however, had recently sealed an alliance with nearby Matamba, and the Portuguese force was crushed.  Following this defeat, Ndongo made a counteroffensive and many of the formerly pro-Portuguese sobas returned to Ndongo. But Portugal managed to retain much of the land they had gained in the earlier wars, and in 1599 Portugal and Ndongo formalized their border.

The Imbangala period 
During the early seventeenth century an uneasy peace held between Portugal and Ndongo. The Portuguese continued their expansion along the Kwanza, founding the presidio of Cambambe in 1602 and attempted, whenever possible, to meddle in Ndongo's politics, especially as it concerned Ndongo's tenuous hold on Kisama and other lands south of the Kwanza River. In the course of their activities in the region south of the Kwanza, the Portuguese came into contact with the Imbangala, a rootless group of nomadic raiders who were ravaging the country. In 1615, the temporary Angolan governor Bento Banha Cardoso encouraged some Imbangala to cross the river and enter Portuguese service, and with their help he expanded the colony along the Lukala River, north of Ndongo.

In 1617 the new governor Luis Mendes de Vasconcelos, after first rejecting the use of Imbangala troops, committed himself to the alliance and began aggressive campaigns against Ndongo.  Thanks to the help of Imbangala bands commanded by Kasanje, Kasa, and others, he was able to invade Ndongo, sack the capital and forced King Ngola Mbandi to take refuge on the island of Kindonga in the Kwanza River.  Thousands of Ndongo subjects were taken prisoner, and Mendes de Vasconcelos sought unsuccessfully to create a puppet government to allow Portuguese rule.

Mendes de Vasconcelos' successor, João Correia de Sousa, tried to make peace with Ndongo, and in 1621, Ngola Mbandi sent his sister, Nzinga Mbandi to Luanda to negotiate on his behalf.  She negotiated a peace treaty in which Portugal agreed to withdraw its advance fort of Ambaca on the Lukala, which had served as a base for the invasion of Ndongo, return a large number of captive ijiko to Ndongo, and force the Imbangala bands who were still ravaging Ndongo to leave. In exchange Ngola Mbandi would leave the island and reestablish himself at the capital and become a Portuguese vassal, paying 100 slaves per year as tribute.

However, João Correia de Sousa became involved in a disastrous war with Kongo and in the aftermath was expelled from the colony by angry citizens. His temporary successor, the bishop, was unable to execute the treaty, and it was then left to the new governor, Fernão de Sousa to settle matters when he came in 1624.

The rise of Queen Nzinga
Portugal's failure to honor its treaty took a toll on Ngola Mbandi, and in desperation, he committed suicide, leaving the country in the hands of his sister Nzinga, who was to serve as regent for his minor son, then in the protective custody of the Imbangala leader Kaza, who had left Portuguese service and joined with Ndongo.  Nzinga, however, only briefly served as regent, and had the young son murdered and succeeded to the throne as ruling queen.  Some European sources call her Anna Xinga.

Father Giovanni took this opportunity to reopen negotiations with Nzinga, whose legitimacy he questioned.  He refused to return the Ijiko, and insisted that Njinga first acknowledge Portuguese sovereignty.  Although Nzinga was prepared to do this, she would not leave the island until her full control was established and the Ijiko returned. When the Portuguese refused, Nzinga encouraged them to run away and enter her service.  The dispute over the Ijiko led to war in 1626, and Sousa's army was able to oust Nzinga from Kidonga, but not to capture her.

Sousa felt confident enough at this point to declare Nzinga deposed and convened some sobas who had supported her to re-elect as new king Hari a Kiluanji, lord of the rocky fortress of Mpungo a Ndongo (or Pungo Andongo) in 1626, but he died in the smallpox epidemic that broke out as a result of the war, and was replaced by Filipe Hari a Ngola.

Nzinga refused to recognize Hari a Ngola claiming that he was of slave origin and not eligible to reign. She reoccupied Kindonga and began mobilizing support of all the sobas opposed to Hari an Angola and Portuguese rule, leading to a second war with Portugal. Sousa's army defeated Nzinga again in 1628, once again forcing her to flee the islands.  Nzinga narrowly escaped capture, at one point having to descend into the Baixa de Cassange on ropes with only a few hundred of her followers remaining.

Desperate, Nzinga joined her forces with the Imbangala band of Kasanje, who forced her to accept a humiliating position as wife and give up her royal regalia.  Nevertheless, she was able to win one of his supporters, subsequently known as Nzinga Mona (or Nzinga's son) away and rebuild her army.  Using this support, Nzinga moved northward and captured the Kingdom of Matamba which became her base, even as she sent a detachment to reoccupy the Kindonga Islands, now sacred because her brother's remains were buried there.

At this point, the history of Nzinga becomes that of Matamba, and her career can be followed in that country.

Ndongo under Filipe Hari a Ndongo's dynasty

Filipe I served the Portuguese loyally in the following decades, even when the Portuguese made a separate peace with Nzinga in 1639. His troops were the largest component in the army the Portuguese used to make conquests and to consolidate their rule in the Dembos area to the north.  When the Dutch invaded Brazil, Filipe served against them, forming the bulk of the forces that defended the rump colony at Masangano, though he suffered a crushing defeat at the hands of Nzinga's army with its Dutch allies in 1647 at the Battle of Kombi.

Following the expulsion of the Dutch, however, Filipe began to feel that the Portuguese were not giving him his full due.  He became involved in disputes with them over his subordinates and jurisdiction, even as his forces marched into disastrous wars in Kisama and the Dembos. His son and successor was equally disappointed, especially following the Portuguese treaty with Ndongo which recognized Nzinga as queen of Ndongo and Matamba in 1657, leaving him feeling dishonored as only ruler of Pungo a Ndongo. In 1670, therefore he revolted, and after a long siege, his fortress fell to the Portuguese army in 1671, thus effectively ending Ndongo as an independent kingdom.

Military 
The Ndongo army did not rely on arms such as shields for defense instead, its personnel were trained to be agile in order to be able to dodge arrows, javelins and lance thrusts. On offence, the army was trained in fencing. This Central African martial arts was referred to as Sanguar. It was described by a Jesuit witness in the 1570s as;

Professional forces trained for war in the army were referred to as quimbares. Before the war against Portugal in the late 16th century, Ndongo could hire Portuguese mercenaries such as the forces of Paulo Dias de Novais in 1575. There also existed special forces referred to as the "Flower of Angola" from 1585 who fell solely under the auspices of the King. Prominent weapons in service of the army included swords and battle axes. Ndongo developed its musketeers starting from the 16th century. In 1585, the army deployed 40 musketeers against Portugal. Queen Nzinga fielded 3 Dutch artillery pieces around 1648 in a failed siege of a Portuguese stronghold at Muxima.

Ndongo's army was organized into mass units by name of mozengos or embalos and further divided into sub formations made up of a centre and two wings. The military force could be redivided once more into units called lucanzos that were tasked for special operations. In battle, the gunzes detachment laid out the initial attacks. During campaigns, the Ndongo army could build field fortifications mostly made of wood. According to the research of historian Thornton; in the 1585 campaign against Portugal, the army "constructed four or five forts 'of wood and straw after their fashion' each a day’s journey apart to cover their retreat." Ndongo possessed in addition, a naval force of rivercrafts. In 1586, the navy employed 8 "great canoes" across the Lucala River with each possessing some personnel of 80–90 people.

Sources 
The history of Ndongo is known largely through the writings of Portuguese missionaries, administrators and travelers.  Much of this work was gathered in the monumental collection of original sources, in the original languages 
by António Brásio. In addition, several Italian Capuchin missionaries, especially Giovanni Antonio Cavazzi and António da Gaeta wrote book-length descriptions of the country in the mid-seventeenth century when it has split into Nzingha's half and Hari a Kiluanji's half. However, the Capuchin's work included detailed recountings of oral tradition.

 António Brásio, ed. Monumenta Missionaria Africana, 1st series (15 volumes, Lisbon, 1952–88)
 Antonio de Oliveira de Cadornega, Historia geral das guerras angolanas, 1680-81, ed. Matias Delgado (3 volumes, Lisbon, 1940–42, reprinted 1972)

Notable people 
 the First Africans in Virginia, including:
 Angela
 Emanuel Driggus
 John Graweere
 Nzinga of Ndongo, Queen of Ndongo

See also
Kingdom of Matamba
List of Ngolas of Ndongo
African military systems to 1800
African military systems after 1800

References

Bibliography 
 Ilídio do Amaral, O Reino do Congo, os Mbundu (ou Ambundos) o Reino dos "Ngola" (ou de Angola) e a presença Portuguesa de finais do século XV a meados do século XVI (Lisbon, 1996)
 David Birmingham, Trade and Conquest in Angola (Oxford, 1966)
 Beatrix Heintze, Studien zur Geschichte Angolas im 16. und 17. Jahrhundert:  Ein Lesebuch (Cologne, 1996).
 Joseph C. Miller, Kings and kinsmen: early Mbundu states in Angola, Oxford, England: Clarendon Press, 1976, 
 Graziano Saccardo, Congo e Angola con la storia dell'antica missione dei Cappuccini (3 vols, Venice, 1982–83)

External links
 Nzingha, Queen of Ndongo (1582--1663)

Ndongo
Ndongo
Ndongo
 
Northern Mbundu
Kingdom of Kongo
16th century in Angola
17th century in Angola
Former countries in Africa